Sefophe  is a village in Central District of Botswana. It is located 27 km south-east of the mining town of Selebi-Phikwe, within 100 km distance of borders with Zimbabwe and South Africa. The population was 6,062 in 2011 census.

References
The people of Sefophe are Batalaote of Mabethela. Their totem is the heart.

Populated places in Central District (Botswana)
Villages in Botswana